The Euro International school shooting occurred on 12 December 2007 at Euro International, a private secondary school in Gurgaon, Haryana, India. The gunmen, 14-year-old students Akash Yadav and 13-year-old Vikas Yadav, shot and killed 14-year-old Abhishek Tyagi.

Details
Eighth-grade student Akash Yadav had gotten into a fight with Tyagi, but it was resolved by school authorities. The school had organised sports day on 9 December 2007 and Yadav, along with his friend, planned to shoot Tyagi, but their plan failed as Tyagi went home earlier than they expected him to. Yadav instead decided to shoot Tyagi on Tuesday as Monday was a holiday. On 11 December, Yadav stole his father's gun, that was left unlocked, and hid it in the school washroom under a toilet seat. At the time of dispersal in the afternoon, Tyagi was going to his bus room when Yadav called out to him from behind. Tyagi's leg got stuck in the stair's grill while Yadav approached him and fired three times, killing Tyagi. Yadav then requested his friend Vikas Yadav to fire. Yadav missed.

References

External links
 Sociopathic - A list of school killings
 Express India
 Reuters India

Deaths by firearm in India
Crime in Gurgaon
2007 murders in India
School shootings in Asia
December 2007 events in India
School killings in Asia
December 2007 crimes
High school shootings
High school killings